The Lost Patrol is a 1934 American pre-Code war film by RKO, directed and produced by John Ford, with Merian C. Cooper as executive producer and Cliff Reid as associate producer from a screenplay by Dudley Nichols from the 1927 novel Patrol by Philip MacDonald. Max Steiner provided the Oscar-nominated score. The film, a remake of a 1929 British silent film, starred Victor McLaglen, Boris Karloff, Wallace Ford, Reginald Denny, J. M. Kerrigan and Alan Hale.

MacDonald’s story, and the 1936 Soviet film The Thirteen (set in the Central Asia desert during the Basmachi rebellion and directed by Mikhail Romm), inspired the 1943 film Sahara, featuring Humphrey Bogart.

Plot

During World War I, the young lieutenant in charge of a small British mounted patrol in the empty Mesopotamian desert is shot and killed by an unseen sniper. This leaves the sergeant at a loss, since he had not been told what their mission is and has no idea where they are. Riding north in the hope of rejoining their brigade, the eleven remaining men reach a deserted oasis where they find water, edible dates, and shelter.

During the night, one of the sentries is killed, the other seriously wounded, and all their horses are stolen, leaving them stranded. They bury the dead man and put his sword at the head of his grave. One by one, the remaining men are picked off by the unseen assailants. During the course of the film, the men talk and reminisce and fight—and deal with their situation. In desperation, the sergeant sends two men chosen by lot on foot for help, but they are caught and their mutilated bodies returned. One man, Abelson, suffering from heat exhaustion, sees a mirage and wanders into deadly rifle fire. The pilot of a British biplane spots the survivors, but nonchalantly lands nearby and despite frantic warnings is killed. After dark, the sergeant takes the machine gun from the aircraft and then sets the plane on fire as a signal to any British troops. Sanders, a religious fanatic, goes mad and walks into deadly fire.

In the end only the sergeant is left and, thinking he too is dead, the six Arabs who have been besieging the oasis advance on foot. Using the machine gun from the aircraft, the sergeant kills them all. A British patrol which had seen the smoke from the burning plane rides up and the officer in charge asks the sergeant roughly where his men are. In silence, the sergeant looks toward their graves, six swords gleaming in the sun.

Cast

 Victor McLaglen as The Sergeant
 Boris Karloff as Sanders
 Wallace Ford as Morelli
 Reginald Denny as George Brown
 J. M. Kerrigan as Quincannon
 Billy Bevan as Herbert Hale
 Alan Hale as Matlow Cook
 Brandon Hurst as Corporal Bell
 Douglas Walton as Pearson
 Sammy Stein as Abelson
 Howard Wilson as Aviator
 Paul Hanson as Jock MacKay

Production and casting

The film was directed by John Ford, who also directed The World Moves On and Judge Priest in the year it came out. Ford co-produced the film along with Merian C. Cooper and Cliff Reid. Cooper himself had a military career. He served in the United States Army Air Service from 1916 to 1921, and would return to military service in World War II, in which he served from 1941 to 1945, reaching the rank of brigadier general. Ford himself served in the United States Navy in World War II from 1942 to 1945, reaching the rank of commander. He stayed in the reserves from 1946 to 1962. In the reserves, Ford reached the rank of rear admiral. The script was written by Dudley Nichols and Garrett Fort, based on the 1927 war novel Patrol, by Philip MacDonald. The novel was first adapted in 1929, by Walter Summers, who directed and wrote the film with Victor McLaglen’s younger brother Cyril in the lead role. The novel and movies focus on the psychological strain on a patrol of British soldiers when they become lost in the desert and surrounded by the enemy in Iraq. MacDonald himself served in the British cavalry during World War I in the Mesopotamian campaign.

Richard Dix was cast to play the lead role in The Lost Patrol but he went into another film instead and Victor McLaglen replaced him. McLaglen himself was a World War I veteran, having served as a Captain (acting) with the 10th Battalion, Middlesex Regiment. Later he claimed to have served with the Royal Irish Fusiliers. He served for a time as military Assistant Provost Marshal for the city of Baghdad. McLaglen would work with Ford and Nichols again in The Informer. The three of them would win Academy Awards for Best Actor, Best Director and Best Adapted Screenplay.
 
Already an actor in 1909, Boris Karloff attempted to enlist in the British Army during World War I, but was rejected due to his heart murmur.

Wallace Ford and Reginald Denny, who played Morelli and Brown, had both served in World War I. Ford served in the United States cavalry, while Denny served as an observer/gunner in the Royal Flying Corps. Denny would eventually found a company that made radio-controlled target aircraft during World War II.

Filming
The Lost Patrol was filmed in Algodones Dunes, California and Yuma, Arizona. Filming began on August 31 and ended on September 22, 1933. In Algodones Dunes, the temperatures soared and one of the film's producers wound up in the hospital with sunstroke.

Reception
Film historian Alun Evans in Brassey's Guide to War Films, considered the production, "... something of a classic, if only for the number of copy-cat pictures it spawned." The film made a profit of $84,000. Film reviewer Paul Tatara claims, "Critics have alternately hailed The Lost Patrol as a flawed masterpiece and a failed experiment. In reality, it's probably a little bit of both." In a contemporary review, Mourdant Hall of The New York Times, noted: "In The Lost Patrol, a picture now sojourning at the Rialto, women are conspicuous by their absence. It is an audible adaptation of Philip MacDonald's novel Patrol, which was exhibited here in silent film form several years ago. The present production is highly effective from a photographic standpoint, but the incidents are often strained."

Among its accolades, it was listed as one of the 10 Best Films of 1934 by The New York Times and received a nomination for Best Picture by the National Board of Review, while Max Steiner was nominated for the Academy Award for Original Music Score.

See also
 List of American films of 1934
 Mesopotamian Campaign
 Boris Karloff filmography
 Bataan, a 1943 MGM film with a similar plot to The Lost Patrol, and also co-written by Fort and Nichols.

Notes

References

Bibliography

 Evans, Alun. Brassey's Guide to War Films. Dulles, Virginia: Potomac Books, 2000. .
 Pallot, James and James Monaco. The Movie Guide. New York: Berkley Publishing Group, 1995. .

External links
 
 
 
 

1934 films
1930s war adventure films
American remakes of British films
American war adventure films
American aviation films
American black-and-white films
1930s English-language films
Films scored by Max Steiner
Films based on British novels
Films directed by John Ford
Films set in deserts
Films set in Iraq
Films shot in California
Films shot in Arizona
Films based on Patrol
Films with screenplays by Dudley Nichols
Sound film remakes of silent films
World War I films based on actual events
World War I films set in the Middle East
Films set in the Ottoman Empire
Films produced by Cliff Reid
Films with screenplays by Garrett Fort
1930s American films